The 1947 Centenary Gentlemen football team was an American football team that represented the Centenary College of Louisiana as a member of the Louisiana Intercollegiate Conference during the 1947 college football season. In their first year under head coach Jess Thompson, the team compiled a 1–9–1 record. In December 1947, the College announced it would no longer provide "football scholarships" and cited financial difficulties of continuing to fund the football program.

Schedule

References

Centenary
Centenary Gentlemen football seasons
Centenary Gentlemen football